The Lithuanian Centre Union, or Centre Union of Lithuania (LCS), was a liberal political party in Lithuania that existed between 1993 and 2003.

History
It was established by the centre-fraction in Sąjūdis in 1990 as the Lithuanian Centre Movement. In 1992 parliamentary election the movement failed to pass 4 per cent threshold and won only 2 seats. In 1993 the movement was reorganised to party. In 1995 municipal elections the party entered many municipal councils and joined coalition with the Homeland Union and the Lithuanian Christian Democratic Party.

In 1996 parliamentary election the party won 8.67 per cent of the votes and 14 seats. It signed agreement of confidence and supply with the Homeland Union and the Lithuanian Christian Democratic Party. in 1997 presidential election the Centre Union supported Valdas Adamkus, who won election.

In spring of 2000, the Centre Union joined informal alliance between the New Union (Social Liberals), the Liberal Union of Lithuania and the Modern Christian-Democratic Union (known as the New Politics Coalition). In 2000 parliamentary election the party won 2.86 per cent of the votes and 2 seats. Coalition as a whole failed to win majority of the seats in Seimas and relied from the support of Lithuanian Peasants Party and Young Lithuania. Coalition lasted only 8 months.

In 2003 the party joined forces with the Liberal Union of Lithuania and the Modern Christian-Democratic Union to form the Liberal and Centre Union.

References

External links 
 Official website in Lithuanian, archived as for April, 2000

Centrist parties in Lithuania
Defunct agrarian political parties
Defunct political parties in Lithuania
Liberal parties in Lithuania
Political parties established in 1993
Political parties disestablished in 2003
1993 establishments in Lithuania
2003 disestablishments in Lithuania